An advanced superionic conductor (AdSIC) in materials science, is fast ion conductor that has a crystal structure close to optimal for fast ion transport (FIT).

History 
The term was introduced in a paper by A.L. Despotuli, A.V. Andreeva and B. Rambaby.

Characteristics 
The rigid ion sublattice of Advanced SuperIonic Conductors (AdSICs) has structure channels where mobile ions of opposite sign migrate. Their ion-transport characteristics display ionic conductivity of ~0.3/Ω cm (RbAg4I5, 300 K) and activation energy of Ei~0.1 eV. This determines the temperature-dependent concentration of mobile ions ni~Ni x eEi/kBT capable to migrate in conduction channels at each moment (Ni~1022/cm3, ni~2x1020/cm3, 300 K).

The Rubidium silver iodide–family is a group of AdSIC compounds and solid solutions that are isostructural with the RbAg4I5 alpha modification. Examples of such compounds with mobile Ag+- and Cu+-cations include KAg4I5, NH4Ag4I5, K1−xCsxAg4I5, Rb1−xCsxAg4I5, CsAg4Br1−xI2+x, CsAg4ClBr2I2, CsAg4Cl3I2, RbCu4Cl3I2 and KCu4I5.

RbAg4I5 AdSIC displays peculiar features of crystal structure and dynamics of mobile ions.

Recently, all solid state micrometre-sized supercapacitors based on AdSICs (nanoionic supercapacitors) had been recognized as critical electron component of future sub-voltage and deep-sub-voltage nanoelectronics and related technologies (22 nm technological node of CMOS and beyond). Researchers also developed an all-solid-state battery employing RbAg4I5 superionic conductor.

References

External links 
 

Electricity